Christo Niewoudt is a former South African cricketer. He was a right-handed batsman and a leg-break bowler who played for Limpopo.

Niewoudt made a single first-class appearance and a single List A appearance in the South African Airways Provincial Challenge competitions of 2006–07. Bowling in the upper-middle order, he scored 22 runs in two first-class innings, and 32 not out in the only first-class innings in which he bowled.

Niewoudt bowled 36 complete overs in his only first-class appearance, taking figures of 4–75.

External links
Christo Niewoudt at Cricket Archive 

South African cricketers
Limpopo cricketers
Living people
Place of birth missing (living people)
Year of birth missing (living people)